John Lawless (born  in Orillia, Ontario) is a retired professional ice hockey player who played in the United Kingdom. Between 1982 and 1999 he played for the Peterborough Pirates, Oxford City Stars, Cardiff Devils, Manchester Storm and Telford Tigers. He also played for the Great Britain national ice hockey team at the 1991 Pool C World Championships. He was inducted to the British Ice Hockey Hall of Fame in 1997.

External links
British Ice Hockey Hall of Fame entry

1961 births
British Ice Hockey Hall of Fame inductees
Canadian ice hockey forwards
Cardiff Devils players
Ice hockey people from Ontario
Living people
Manchester Storm (1995–2002) players
People from Orillia
Canadian expatriate ice hockey players in England
Canadian expatriate ice hockey players in Wales
Naturalised citizens of the United Kingdom